Four Winds Hartford is a  casino in Hartford, Michigan that opened on August 30, 2011. It is one of the Four Winds Casinos, which are all owned and operated by the Pokagon Band of Potawatomi Indians.

The design of the casino was inspired by the traditions of the Potawatomi people.

History 
The casino opened on August 30, 2011 after 14 months of design and construction. It was the second Four Winds casino opened by the Pokagon Band. The original project cost  and was designed by Hnedak Bobo Group.

Gaming 
The  gaming floor features over 550 slot machines and nine table games, including blackjack, poker, and roulette. The Four Winds Casinos loyalty program, the W Club, is in use at this property.

Dining 
The casino includes a 74-seat restaurant with an attached 15-seat bar.

See also 

 List of casinos in Michigan

References

External links 
 

2011 establishments in Michigan
Buildings and structures in Van Buren County, Michigan
Casinos in Michigan
Casinos completed in 2011
Native American casinos
Tourist attractions in Van Buren County, Michigan
Native American history of Michigan
Pokagon Band of Potawatomi Indians